Phoebe is a genus of longhorn beetles of the subfamily Lamiinae, containing the following species:

 Phoebe alba Martins & Galileo, 2004
 Phoebe bicornis (Olivier, 1795)
 Phoebe cava (Germar, 1824)
 Phoebe concinna White, 1856  
 Phoebe cornuta (Olivier, 1795)
 Phoebe fryana Lane, 1966
 Phoebe goiana Lane, 1966
 Phoebe luteola Bates, 1881
 Phoebe mafra Martins & Galileo, 1998
 Phoebe mexicana Bates, 1881
 Phoebe nivea Lacordaire, 1872
 Phoebe ornator (Tippmann, 1960)
 Phoebe phoebe (Lepeletier & Audinet-Serville, 1825)
 Phoebe spegazzinii Bruch, 1908
 Phoebe subalbaria Belon, 1896
 Phoebe tinga Martins & Galileo, 1998

References

Hemilophini